Four-time defending champion Diede de Groot defeated Yui Kamiji in the final, 3–6, 6–1, 6–1 to win the women's singles wheelchair tennis title at the 2022 US Open. With the win, de Groot completed the Grand Slam, and became the first player in any discipline of tennis to do so in consecutive years. This also marked the sixth consecutive year that de Groot and Kamiji contested the final.

Seeds

Draw

Draw

References

External links 
 Draw

Wheelchair Women's Singles
U.S. Open, 2022 Women's Singles